Colombia Justa Libres (CJL) is a right-wing Colombian political party founded in 2017 that groups the majority of evangelical denominations in the country together. This includes, among others, Assemblies of God, Foursquare Church, Peace Mission to the Nations, and Spring of Eternal Life. During the 2018 Colombian parliamentary election, four of its members were elected to the Congress of Colombia. Ahead of the 2022 legislative election, the party formed the Nos Une Colombia coalition with the MIRA. It has the slogan of "Let's do it together!"  and a youth wing known as RUGE!

Ideology 
The party adheres to conservatism in the anti-abortion framework with right-wing Christian democratic principles. It also adheres to a few Agrarian ideas [citation needed].

History 
Colombia Justa Libres emerged from a merger of two political movements:
 Libres, a movement that had already participated in the 2015 Colombian regional and municipal elections, launched a list to the Bogotá City Council with Ricardo Arias Mora, leader of the movement, as a candidate for Mayor of Bogotá. Arias obtained around 100,000 votes. In addition, he presented the project of the ministry of the family to Former President Juan Manuel Santos, after the plebiscite on the Colombian peace accords of 2016. The list to the Bogotá city council managed to obtain over 70,000 votes and got a representative: Emel Rojas.
 Colombia Justa, which began when Pastor Héctor Pardo of the Tabernáculo de la Fe Church, Pastor Eduardo Cañas of the Manantial de Vida Church and Pastor John Milton Rodríguez of the Misión Paz a las Naciones Church participated in the peace dialogues between the Santos government and the FARC. After the meetings, they became disenchanted with participating in the dialogues, claiming that it "facilitated" the FARC's access to power. The three pastors invited more leaders from Colombia. Four national and more than seventy regional calls were made to communicate with victims of the armed conflict, military, Afro-descendants and indigenous peoples, founding Colombia Justa.

Colombia Justa and Libres subsequently constituted to be a significant group of citizens: Colombia Justa Libres on 11 December 2017. In the 2018 Colombian parliamentary election, it managed to obtain 431,506 votes, 3%, which is necessary to constitute itself as a political party, achieving three senators and one representative.

During the 2019 local elections, they supported the candidate at the time, Miguel Uribe Turbay, and obtained two seats in the Bogotá council.

In 2021, a conflict between the leadership of the party occurred upon the resignation of Pastor Eduardo Cañas, whose position was filled by another of the directors: John Milton Rodríguez. This violated the statutes of the party, as the party's Council of Elders were intended to choose his replacement. Subsequently, Rodríguez, who faced no official opposition, with the permission of the party Supervisor Héctor Pardo, held a parallel assembly designating himself as the presidential candidate of the party, which was opposed by the other members, mainly Ricardo Arias Mora, another presidential candidate of the party, and Pardo, who later resigned from office. Arias led a lawsuit about this before the Electoral Council.  The lawsuit succeeded, and on 15 February 2022, the National Electoral Council revoked Rodríguez's presidential candidacy application. However, two months later, on 21 April, the Electoral Council decided to allow Rodríguez to compete as a presidential candidate, on the grounds that the application "was granted by the legitimate authorities".

Representatives

Council of Bogotá 

 Emel Rojas Castillo
 Marco Acosta Rico

House of Representatives 

 Representative for Bogotá: Carlos Eduardo Acosta Lozano

Senate of the Republic 

 John Milton Rodríguez
 Edgar Enrique Palacio

Election results

Legislative elections

Religious sector coalition 
In September 2021, the directors and congressmen of Colombia Justa Libres made an agreement with the MIRA party to present joint lists to the Senate and the Chamber in more than 7 departments or constituencies, calling it the Nos Une Colombia coalition. It seeks to promote and defend religious freedom in Colombia by means of elected congressmen.

See also 

 Religion in Colombia
 List of political parties in Colombia

References

External links 

Political parties established in 2017
Protestant political parties
Protestantism in Colombia
Christian democratic parties in Colombia